Samoidae is a  family of the harvestman infraorder Grassatores with about fifty described species.

Description
The body length of members of this family ranges from about two to almost six millimeters. They are dull light brown to yellow or green yellow with darker mottling, and sometimes dark brown.

Distribution
Samoidae from Polynesia, Melanesia, Australia, Mexico, the West Indies and Venezuela are all remarkably similar, while the species from Africa, Madagascar, Seychelles and Indonesia do at least in part not belong to this family.

Relationships
The relationship with other families in the Samooidea is not yet understood.

Name
The name of the type genus is derived from the type locality Samoa.

Species
 Akdalima Silhavy, 1977
 Akdalima jamaicana V. Silhavy, 1979 — Jamaica
 Akdalima vomeroi Silhavy, 1977 — Mexico

 Arganotus Silhavy, 1977
 Arganotus macrochelis (Goodnight & Goodnight, 1953) — Mexico
 Arganotus robustus V. Silhavy, 1979 — Haiti
 Arganotus strinatii V. Silhavy, 1979 — Guatemala

 Badessa Sørensen, in L. Koch 1886
 Badessa ampycoides Sørensen, in L. Koch 1886 — Fiji

 Badessania Roewer, 1949
 Badessania metatarsalis Roewer, 1949 — New South Wales

 Benoitinus M. Rambla, 1983
 Benoitinus elegans M. Rambla, 1983 — Seychelles

 Cornigera M. A. González-Sponga, 1987
 Cornigera flava M. A. González-Sponga, 1987 — Venezuela

 Feretrius Simon, 1879
 Feretrius quadrioculatus (L. Koch, 1865) — Samoa

 Fijicolana Roewer, 1963
 Fijicolana tuberculata Roewer, 1963 — Melanesia

 Hovanoceros Lawrence, 1959
 Hovanoceros bison Lawrence, 1959

 Hummelinckiolus V. Silhavy, 1979
 Hummelinckiolus parvus V. Silhavy, 1979 — Leeward Islands (Guadeloupe, Montserrat, St. Kitts, Nevis)
 † Hummelinckiolus silhavyi Cokendolpher & Poinar, 1998 — fossil: Dominican amber

 Kalominua Sørensen, 1932 — Venezuela
 Kalominua alta (M. A. González-Sponga, 1987)
 Kalominua bicolor Sørensen, 1932
 Kalominua bromeliaca (M. A. González-Sponga, 1987)
 Kalominua inermichela (H. E. M. Soares & S. Avram, 1981)
 Kalominua leonensis (M. A. González-Sponga, 1987)
 Kalominua manueli (M. A. González-Sponga, 1987)
 Kalominua minuta (M. A. González-Sponga, 1987)
 Kalominua tiarensis (M. A. González-Sponga, 1987)

 Malgaceros Lawrence, 1959
 Malgaceros boviceps Lawrence, 1959

 Maracaynatum Roewer, 1949
 Maracaynatum cubanum V. Silhavy, 1979 — Cuba
 Maracaynatum linaresi (H. E. M. Soares & S. Avram, 1981) — Venezuela
 Maracaynatum mariaeteresae M. A. González-Sponga, 1987 — Venezuela
 Maracaynatum orchidearum Roewer, 1949 — Venezuela
 Maracaynatum stridulans V. Silhavy, 1979 — Cuba
 Maracaynatum trinidadense V. Silhavy, 1979 — Trinidad

 Microconomma Roewer, 1915
 Microconomma armatipes Roewer, 1915 — Cameroon

 Mitraceras Loman, 1902 — Seychelles
 Mitraceras crassipalpum Loman, 1902
 Mitraceras pulchra M. Rambla, 1983

 Neocynortina Goodnight & Goodnight, 1983
 Neocynortina dixoni Goodnight & Goodnight, 1983 — Costa Rica

 Orsa V. Silhavy, 1979
 Orsa daphne V. Silhavy, 1979 — Haiti

 Parasamoa Goodnight & Goodnight, 1957
 Parasamoa gressitti Goodnight & Goodnight, 1957

 Pellobunus Banks, 1905
 Pellobunus camburalesi M. Rambla, 1978 — Venezuela
 Pellobunus haitiensis (V. Silhavy, 1979) — Haiti
 Pellobunus insularis Banks, 1905 — Costa Rica, Panama
 Pellobunus insulcatus (Roewer, 1954) — El Salvador
 Pellobunus longipalpus Goodnight & Goodnight, 1947 — Trinidad
 Pellobunus mexicanus Goodnight & Goodnight, 1971 — Mexico
 † Pellobunus proavus J. C. Cokendolpher, 1987 — fossil: Dominican amber
 Pellobunus trispinatus Goodnight & Goodnight, 1947 — Trinidad

 Reventula V. Silhavy, 1979
 Reventula amabilis V. Silhavy, 1979 — Jamaica

 Samoa Sørensen, in L. Koch 1886
 Samoa variabilis Sørensen, in L. Koch 1886 — Samoa
 Samoa obscura Sørensen, in L. Koch 1886 — Samoa
 Samoa sechellana M. Rambla, 1983 — Seychelles

 Sawaiellus Roewer, 1949
 Sawaiellus berlandi Roewer, 1949 — Samoa

 Tetebius Roewer, 1949
 Tetebius latibunus Roewer, 1949 — Tete, Mozambique

 Vlachiolus V. Silhavy, 1979
 Vlachiolus vojtechi V. Silhavy, 1979 — Cuba

 Waigeucola Roewer, 1949
 Waigeucola palpalis Roewer, 1949 — Indonesia

Footnotes

References
 's Biology Catalog: Samoidae
  (eds.) (2007): Harvestmen - The Biology of Opiliones. Harvard University Press 

Harvestmen
Arachnids of Africa
Harvestman families